Hans Hagen (born 1953) is a professor of computer science at the University of Kaiserslautern. His main research interests are scientific visualization and geometric modelling.

From 1999 to 2003 he was the editor in chief of IEEE Transactions on Visualization and Computer Graphics.

He got the John Gregory Memorial Award and the Solid Modelling Pioneer Award  for his achievements in Geometric Modeling in 2002. His lifetime contributions to Scientific Visualization were honored by the IEEE Visualization Career Award  and the IEEE Visualization Academy of Science membership.

References

1953 births
German computer scientists
living people